The Czech Republic men's national under-16 and under-17 basketball team is a national basketball team of the Czech Republic, administered  by the Czech Basketball Federation.  The team competes at the FIBA U16 European Championship and the FIBA Under-17 Basketball World Cup.

FIBA U16 European Championship participations

FIBA Under-17 Basketball World Cup participations

See also
Czech Republic men's national basketball team
Czech Republic men's national under-18 basketball team
Czech Republic women's national under-17 basketball team

References

External links
Official website 
Archived records of the Czech Republic team participations

Basketball in the Czech Republic
Basketball
Men's national under-16 basketball teams
Men's national under-17 basketball teams